U.S. Route 301 (US 301) in the state of Maryland is a major highway that runs  from the Governor Harry W. Nice Memorial Bridge over the Potomac River into Virginia northeast to Delaware. It passes through three of Maryland's four main regions: Southern Maryland, the Baltimore-Washington Metropolitan Area, and the Eastern Shore. US 301 serves mainly as a bypass of Baltimore and Washington, D.C. from Virginia to Delaware.

Route description
US 301 is a Blue Star Memorial Highway for its entire length in Maryland. The Federated Garden Clubs of Maryland declared the U.S. Highway a Blue Star Memorial Highway as a tribute to the United States Armed Forces in 1948, and a 1953 resolution signed by Governor William Preston Lane, Jr., officially dedicated US 301 as such. The highway's primary name from the Potomac River to Bowie is Robert Crain Highway. Robert Crain was a Charles County farmer and lawyer who spearheaded the construction of a new highway to directly connect Baltimore and Southern Maryland that was completed in 1927. Along its concurrency with US 50 and unsigned I-595 from Bowie to the Severn River, US 301 follows John Hanson Highway. The freeway is named for John Hanson, the first President of the Continental Congress in 1781.

Short portions of US 301 are included among several Maryland Scenic Byways. US 301 is part of the Religious Freedom Byway, from Maryland Route 257 (MD 257) to MD 234 near Newburg and from Popes Creek Road at Faulkner to Chapel Point Road at Bel Alton in southern Charles County. That byway is also a National Scenic Byway, the Religious Freedom Byway. US 301 is included in the Booth's Escape Scenic Byway from the Potomac River to Edge Hill Road in Newburg, from Popes Creek Road at Faulkner to Bel Alton Newtown Road at Bel Alton, and along its concurrency with MD 5 from Waldorf to Brandywine. The U.S. Highway is part of the Star-Spangled Banner Scenic Byway from MD 382 at Marlton to MD 725 in Upper Marlboro.

US 301 is almost entirely maintained by the Maryland State Highway Administration. The exceptions include the Governor Harry W. Nice Bridge across the Potomac River and the Chesapeake Bay Bridge across the Chesapeake Bay and the respective bridges' approach roads and toll plazas, which are maintained by the Maryland Transportation Authority. US 301 is a part of the National Highway System for its entire length.

Newburg to Bowie

US 301 enters Maryland at the Virginia state line on the right bank of the Potomac River near Dahlgren in King George County, Virginia, from which the U.S. Highway continues toward Bowling Green and Richmond. The highway crosses the Potomac River on the Governor Harry W. Nice Memorial Bridge, a four-lane divided bridge. US 301 becomes a four-lane divided highway named Robert Crain Highway just east of the southbound-only all-electronic toll gantry for the bridge and to the north of the Morgantown Generating Station. The highway parallels CSX's Popes Creek Subdivision rail line on a sweeping curve from east to north through the community of Newburg. US 301 passes a welcome center and has a directional crossover intersection with MD 257 (Rock Point Road). The highway curves northwest at its directional crossover intersection with MD 234 (Budds Creek Road) at the hamlet of Glasva, then curves north again between Faulkner and Bel Alton, from which Chapel Point Road leads west to Chapel Point State Park.

US 301 passes through the hamlet of Spring Hill shortly before it enters the town of La Plata, the county seat of Charles County. The highway passes to the west of the center of town and intersects MD 6, which heads east as Charles Street and west as Port Tobacco Road, and MD 225 (Hawthorne Road). US 301 leaves La Plata at Rosewick Road and gradually curves northeast toward White Plains. There, the highway meets the eastern end of MD 227 (Marshall Corner Road), passes near the eastern end of the Indian Head Rail Trail, and intersects Billingsley Road, which leads to the southern end of MD 925 (Old Washington Road). US 301 expands to six lanes near Smallwood Drive, where it passes south of a park and ride lot serving MTA Maryland commuter buses. The highway runs through the planned community of St. Charles, which contains the St. Charles Towne Center shopping mall. The highway continues through the unincorporated town of Waldorf, where the highway meets the eastern end of MD 228 (Berry Road) and the northern end of MD 5 Business (Leonardtown Road).

At the north end of Waldorf, US 301 has a partial intersection with MD 5 (Mattawoman Beantown Road); access from northbound MD 5 to southbound US 301 is via Mattawoman Drive. The two highways curve north and cross Mattawoman Creek into Prince George's County. The highway temporarily gains extra lanes while passing through the area north of the county line, during which the highways cross Timothy Branch. US 301 and MD 5 diverge at a partial interchange in Brandywine, from which MD 5 continues north along Branch Avenue toward Washington and US 301 drops to four lanes. US 301 curves northeast and intersects Brandywine Road, which heads east through the center of Brandywine as MD 381. Brandywine Road to the west provides access from southbound US 301 to northbound MD 5 and from southbound MD 5 to northbound US 301. US 301 heads through the communities of Cheltenham and Rosaryville, where the highway passes along the east side of Rosaryville State Park. The highway continues through Marlton, where it crosses Charles Branch and meets the northern end of MD 382 (Croom Road).

Old Crain Highway splits north from US 301 as the highway approaches Upper Marlboro, the county seat of Prince George's County. The U.S. Highway curves north and crosses CSX's Popes Creek Subdivision rail line at-grade and heads across the Western Branch of the Patuxent River south of its cloverleaf interchange with MD 4 (Stephanie Roper Highway). US 301 meets the eastern end of MD 725 (Marlboro Pike) east of Upper Marlboro. The highway continues north, passing a pair of weigh stations, and gains a wide median at the southern edge of the city of Bowie. There, the U.S. Highway intersects Old Central Avenue, which is part of MD 978, and has a six-ramp interchange with MD 214 (Central Avenue). The movements from northbound US 301 to eastbound MD 214 and from eastbound MD 214 to southbound US 301 are made via Old Central Avenue (unsigned MD 978B). US 301 follows the eastern city limit of Bowie and expands to six lanes south of its intersection with MD 197 (Collington Road). Past this junction, the road intersects Ball Park Road, which leads east to Prince George's Stadium, the home ballpark of the Bowie Baysox baseball team. The U.S. Highway briefly fully enters the city of Bowie just south of its cloverleaf interchange with US 50 (John Hanson Highway) and MD 3, which heads north along Robert Crain Highway while US 301 heads east concurrent with US 50 and unsigned I-595.

Bowie to Queenstown

US 301 and US 50 head east along John Hanson Highway, a six-lane freeway, across the Patuxent River into Anne Arundel County. The highways have junctions with MD 424 north of Davidsonville and the southern end of I-97 in Parole. US 301 and US 50 pass to the north of Annapolis, which is accessed by interchanges with MD 665, MD 450, MD 2, and MD 70. The I-595 designation ends at the MD 70 interchange. MD 2 joins the U.S. Highways along the freeway to cross the Severn River. MD 2 splits north from the U.S. Highways at a common interchange with the eastern end of MD 450, where the freeway's name changes to Blue Star Memorial Highway. US 301 and US 50 meet MD 179 near Cape St. Claire and pass by Sandy Point State Park right before the highways use the dual-span Chesapeake Bay Bridge to cross the Chesapeake Bay. US 301 and US 50 meet MD 8 on Kent Island in Queen Anne's County. The six-lane freeway parallels MD 18 and has numerous right-in/right-out interchange with local roads as it passes through Stevensville and Chester. US 301 and US 50 parallel MD 18 across the Kent Narrows onto the mainland of the Delmarva Peninsula, then the freeway continues through more right-in/right-out interchanges in Grasonville before the U.S. Highways diverge at Queenstown.

Queenstown to Warwick
The highway passes along the edge of the town of Queenstown, where the highway meets MD 18 (Main Street) and MD 456 (Del Rhodes Avenue) at a pair of superstreet intersections. Access from southbound US 301 to eastbound US 50 and from westbound US 50 to northbound US 301 is via MD 18 at the Queenstown Premium Outlets. US 301 gradually curves northeast as it passes to the south and east of Centreville, the county seat of Queen Anne's County. The highway has a five-ramp partial cloverleaf interchange with MD 213 (Centreville Road) south of town and a double-roundabout partial cloverleaf interchange with MD 304 (Ruthsburg Road) north of Mill Stream Branch. US 301 has an oblique at-grade crossing of the Centerville Branch of the Northern Line of the Maryland and Delaware Railroad. The highway parallels the railroad through an intersection with MD 305 (Hope Road) at Carville and unsigned MD 834 (Hayden Clark Road), where the median temporarily widens for the Bay Country Welcome Center.

US 301 diverges from the railroad at its intersection with MD 405 (Price Station Road) at Price. The U.S. highway continues north through junctions with MD 19 (Roberts Station Road) and the western end of MD 302 (Barclay Road) and a superstreet intersection with MD 300 (Sudlersville Road). US 301 has a four-ramp partial cloverleaf interchange with MD 290 (Dudley Corner Road) just south of Red Lion Branch. The U.S. Highway has a superstreet intersection with MD 544 (McGinnes Road) just west of that highway's eastern end at MD 313 and just south of Unicorn Branch. US 301 crosses the Chester River into Kent County west of Millington. The highway continues through an indirect interchange with MD 291 (River Road); access to MD 291 is via side ramps with two unsigned portions of MD 701, which parallels the northbound and southbound sides of US 301 as Howard Johnson Road and Edge Road, respectively.

US 301 has an at-grade railroad crossing with the Chestertown Branch of the Northern Line of the Maryland and Delaware Railroad west of the junction of the two Northern Line branches at Massey. North of the railroad, the U.S. highway has a superstreet intersection with MD 313 (Galena Road) south of Galena. US 301 has a diamond interchange with MD 290 (Galena Sassafras Road) before crossing the Sassafras River into Cecil County west of Sassafras. The highway meets the northern end of MD 299 (Massey Sassafras Road), where there is a weigh station in the southbound direction, and passes to the south of Warwick. US 301 reaches the Maryland–Delaware state line, where it continues northeast into New Castle County along an all-electronic toll freeway.

History

In 1940, the completion of the Harry W. Nice Memorial Bridge heralded the entry of US 301 into Maryland. A short connector between the northern end of the bridge and MD 3 resulted in the majority of the latter route being taken over by US 301, with only a small portion remaining signed as MD 3 (this portion is now MD 257).

Originally, the route went all the way along former MD 3 into Baltimore and ended near present-day MD 295 (Russell Street). As US 301, it was upgraded into a four- and six-lane divided highway throughout in the 1940s and 1950s. In the 1960s, the route was rerouted along US 50 to the Eastern Shore where it split from US 50 and was routed from there up former Maryland Route 71 into Delaware. Today, Route 301 is a multi-lane highway throughout its path through the state with the exception of the Governor Harry W. Nice Memorial Bridge; the nine miles (14 km) of MD 3 between US 50 and I-97 is also a four- and six-lane divided highway and is part of the same continuous physical route.

The segment of the highway between the eastern end of the Chesapeake Bay Bridge and the US 50/US 301 split in Queenstown was originally built as a four-lane at-grade divided expressway. By the late 1980s, traffic levels were so high that the route was upgraded into a six-lane grade-separated limited-access expressway, with most of the intersections converted into right-in/right-out interchanges, and a few others being converted into more standard interchanges. The upgrade of the route was completed by the early 1990s.

The US 50/US 301 concurrency on the Eastern Shore included a four-lane drawspan connecting Kent Island to the mainland; the upgrade from four to six lanes included rerouting US 50/US 301 onto a high-level fixed span just north of there, with the drawspan now being used for MD 18. Further north, where US 301 is running by itself as four-lane limited access, it reached MD 213 at a traffic signal which was the last full traffic signal on northbound US 301 in Maryland, but that signal was then replaced by the current interchange there.

The Maryland Department of Transportation built a dumbbell interchange to replace the superstreet intersection with MD 304. The interchange project constructed a bridge carrying MD 304 over US 301. This interchange was the top transportation priority for Queen Anne's County for years and was pushed for by students at Queen Anne's County High School after a student at the school was killed in an accident at the intersection in 2010. A groundbreaking ceremony was held on September 23, 2014, with several Queen Anne's County commissioners and representatives from state government in attendance. The interchange opened to traffic on August 15, 2017.

On January 10, 2019, US 301 in Delaware was shifted to a tollway linking the divided US 301 in Maryland with Delaware Route 1, providing a multi-lane alternative to I-95 between northern Delaware and Washington, D.C.  As a result, MD 299 intersection became the last exit before toll, and US 301 no longer narrowed to a two-lane roadway as it reached the Delaware state line.

The Maryland Transportation Authority has been studying the Governor Harry W. Nice Memorial Bridge over the Potomac River since about 2006, and identified a preferred alternative which involved replacing the two-lane span with a new bridge with four lanes, shoulders and a new two-way bike and pedestrian trail. On November 21, 2016, the Maryland Transportation Authority Board voted unanimously to build a new four-lane bridge just north of the current structure. Construction began in June 2020. A ribbon-cutting ceremony for the new bridge was held on October 12, 2022, with Governor Larry Hogan in attendance, while the bridge opened to traffic the following day.

A group known as the Eastern Shoreway Alliance is seeking to have US 301 from Queenstown to the Delaware line redesignated as the Eastern Shoreway, similar to the Ocean Gateway designation of US 50 to the south.

Junction list

See also

References

External links

US 301 at MDRoads.com
US 301 at AARoads.com
Maryland Roads - US 301
Maryland Transportation Authority's Governor Harry W. Nice Memorial Bridge Improvement Project

01-3
 Maryland
Roads in Cecil County, Maryland
Roads in Kent County, Maryland
Roads in Queen Anne's County, Maryland
Roads in Anne Arundel County, Maryland
Roads in Prince George's County, Maryland
Roads in Charles County, Maryland